Uroplatus fetsy is a species of lizard in the family Gekkonidae. It is endemic to Madagascar.

References

Uroplatus
Reptiles described in 2019
Taxa named by Mark D. Scherz